Cyril Asplan Beldam (15 October 1869 – 7 September 1940) was an English first-class cricketer active 1894–1900 who played for Middlesex. A brother of George Beldam, he was born in Northfleet; died in Marylebone.

References

1869 births
1940 deaths
English cricketers
Middlesex cricketers
A. J. Webbe's XI cricketers
A. Priestley's XI cricketers